Harasawa (written: 原沢 or はらさわ in hiragana) is a Japanese surname. Notable people with the surname include:

, Japanese judoka
, Japanese voice actor

Japanese-language surnames